The Nchanga mines are a group of copper mining operations near the municipal town of Chingola in Zambia.

Nchanga Open Pit Mine 

The Open Pits at Nchanga Mine are situated in a crescent shaped structure 11 km long around the municipal town of Chingola in Zambia. Covering nearly 30 km² it is the second largest open cast mine in the world. The deepest part of the pit is 400 m lower than the surrounding plateau.

Open Pit mining at Nchanga started in 1955, in the main Nchanga Open Pit. Subsequently, nine medium sized open pits, called satellite pits, have also been mined at one time or the other.  

At present, mining is concentrated on the main Nchanga pit, with satellite planned for future extensions, as economics and processing technological developments unfold. Together they are termed generically as the Nchanga Open Pits.

Nchanga Underground Mine 

The Nchanga underground mine accounts for approximately 45% of the total copper production at Nchanga. Over the past 10 years the annual production has averaged 93,00 tonnes of contained copper. Currently, there are three distinct ore bodies from which mining is taking place, namely, the lower orebody (LOB), Block `A' and Chingola `B'. These contribute 63%, 35% and 8% copper ore production respectively.

Nchanga Process Plants 

The Nchanga processing plants consist of two concentrators, East Mill and West Mill and the tailings leach plant.

The East Mill treats ore from the open pit while the West Mill treats ore from underground. In addition cobalt is treated at the West Mill Cobalt Plant. The tailings leach plant produces copper cathodes from concentrator tailings and reclaimed tailings.

References

Buildings and structures in Copperbelt Province
Surface mines in Zambia
Open-pit mines